Amnestus is a genus of burrowing bugs in the family Cydnidae. There are more than 40 described species in Amnestus.

Species
These 48 species belong to the genus Amnestus:

 Amnestus andersoni Mayorga & Mayorga, 2017
 Amnestus basidentatus Froeschner, 1960
 Amnestus bergrothi Distant
 Amnestus brailovskyanus Mayorga & Mayorga, 2017
 Amnestus brailovskyi Mayorga & Cervantes
 Amnestus brunneus Signoret
 Amnestus calakmulensis Mayorga & Cervantes
 Amnestus carinatus Mayorga & Cervantes
 Amnestus carinopilosus Mayorga & Cervantes
 Amnestus championi Distant
 Amnestus chiapensis Mayorga & Cervantes
 Amnestus cristobalensis Mayorga & Cervantes
 Amnestus dallasi Distant
 Amnestus denticulatus Mayorga & Cervantes
 Amnestus diminuatus Barber
 Amnestus ficus Mayorga & Cervantes
 Amnestus forreri Distant
 Amnestus foveatus Froeschner
 Amnestus henryi Mayorga & Cervantes
 Amnestus laevifemoralis Mayorga & Cervantes
 Amnestus lateralis Signoret, 1883
 Amnestus longinoi Mayorga & Cervantes
 Amnestus lorenae Mayorga & Cervantes
 Amnestus marcelae Mayorga & Cervantes
 Amnestus mendeli
 Amnestus oaxacensis Mayorga & Mayorga, 2017
 Amnestus obscurus Mayorga & Cervantes
 Amnestus ortegae Mayorga & Mayorga, 2017
 Amnestus pallidus Zimmer, 1910
 Amnestus puncticarinatus Mayorga & Cervantes
 Amnestus pusillus Uhler, 1876
 Amnestus pusio (Stål, 1860)
 Amnestus radialis Froeschner
 Amnestus rugosus Mayorga & Cervantes
 Amnestus santiagensis Mayorga & Cervantes
 Amnestus septemclavatus Mayorga & Cervantes
 Amnestus sexdentatus Froeschner
 Amnestus signoreti Distant
 Amnestus sinuosus Mayorga & Cervantes
 Amnestus spinifrons (Say, 1825)
 Amnestus stali Distant
 Amnestus subferrugineus Westwood
 Amnestus trimaculatus Froeschner, 1960
 Amnestus uhleri Distant
 Amnestus zacki
 † Amnestus electricus Thomas, 1994
 † Amnestus guapinolinus Thomas, 1988
 † Amnestus priscus Thomas, 1994

References

Further reading

 
 

Cydnidae
Articles created by Qbugbot
Pentatomomorpha genera